Hyperdaze is the second studio album by Australian metalcore band Void of Vision. It was released on 13 September 2019 by UNFD. It was produced by Northlane guitarist Jon Deiley and Lance Prenc, and recorded at Prenc's home studio and Pony Music Rehearsal Studios in Hallam.

Background and promotion
On 22 July 2019, UNFD announced that they would be releasing four band's new songs, Void of Vision was later revealed to be one of them.

On 23 July, their new single "Hole in Me" was released alongside an accompanying music video. Their sophomore studio album Hyperdaze was then announced for a release date of 13 September.  On 3 September, their second single "Babylon" was released. On 9 September, their third single "If Only" was released alongside an accompanying music video.

From October–December, Void of Vision are set to join Northlane on their Australian and European legs of their Alien World Tour.

Writing and composition
About how the album will be heavy and angry, vocalist Jack Bergin said: 
"From fine-tuning and tweaking all the synths and accompaniment to the grittiness and aggression of the vocals, we really wanted the pure anger that went into making these recordings to translate out the other side – something I feel we haven’t quite grasped on previous records."

Bergin also revealed that the themes present on the album are: "Pure hatred, self-loathing and nihilism."

"Hole in Me" was described as sounding "like The Prodigy blended with metalcore with plenty of ambient synth and distorted screams."

Track listing

Personnel
Void of Vision
 Jack Bergin – unclean vocals
 James McKendrick – lead guitar, clean vocals
 Mitch Fairlie – rhythm guitar
 George Murphy – drums

Production
 Jon Deiley – producer
 Lance Prenc – producer, mixing, mastering, engineering
 Scott Simpson – vocal engineering

Charts

References

2019 albums
Void of Vision albums
UNFD albums